Julie Bernat (30 January 1827 – 27 October 1912), known by her stage name of Mademoiselle Judith, was a French actress.

Life
She entered the Comédie-Française company in 1846 and was made its 274th Sociétaire in 1852. She left the company in 1866.

Appearances

Comédie-Française 
 1846: Le Barbier de Séville by Beaumarchais: Rosine 
 1847: Un poète by Jules Barbier: Laetice 
 1847: Pour arriver by Émile Souvestre: Juliette 
 1847: Le Misanthrope by Molière: Eliante 
 1847: Tartuffe by Molière: Mariane   
 1847: Les Aristocraties by Étienne Arago: Laurence  
 1847: Un caprice by Alfred de Musset: Mathilde 
 1847: Dom Juan ou le Festin de pierre by Molière: Elvire 
 1848: Le Puff ou Mensonge et vérité by Eugène Scribe: Antonia 
 1848: Thersite by Villarceaux: Niséis 
 1848: Le roi attend by George Sand: Madeleine Béjart 
 1848: La Marquise d'Aubray by Charles Lafont: Valentine 
 1848: La Rue Quincampoix by Jacques-François Ancelot: Jeanne 
 1849: L'Amitié des femmes by Édouard-Joseph-Ennemond Mazères: Marguerite 
 1849: Louison by Alfred de Musset: la duchesse 
 1849: Passe-temps de duchesse by Gaston de Montheau: la duchesse 
 1850: Trois entr'actes pour l'Amour médecin by Alexandre Dumas: la Du Croisy 
 1850: Charlotte Corday by François Ponsard: Charlotte Corday 
 1850: La Queue du chien d'Alcibiade by Léon Gozlan: Adeline 
 1850: La Migraine by Jean-Pons-Guillaume Viennet: Madame Dhéricourt 
 1850: Le Mariage de Figaro by Beaumarchais: la comtesse  
 1850: Un mariage sous la Régence by Léon Guillard: la duchesse de Berry 
 1851: Christian et Marguerite by Pol Mercier et Édouard Fournier: Delphine 
 1851: Les Bâtons flottants by Pierre-Chaumont Liadières: Madamoisselle Duvernet 
 1853: Le Lys dans la vallée by Théodore Barrière and Arthur de Beauplan after Honoré de Balzac: la comtesse Henriette de Mortsauf 
 1856: Tartuffe by Molière: Elmire   
 1858: Le Bourgeois gentilhomme by Molière: Dorimène
 1859: Souvent homme varie by Auguste Vacquerie: Fideline 
 1861: Les Femmes savantes by Molière: Armande

Other companies 
 1876: La Reine Margot by Alexandre Dumas, théâtre de la Porte Saint-Martin: Catherine de Médici

References

1827 births
1912 deaths
19th-century French actresses
French stage actresses
Sociétaires of the Comédie-Française